Hereford and Worcester County Council was the county council of the non-metropolitan county of Hereford and Worcester in west England. It came into its powers on 1 April 1974 and was abolished on 31 March 1998. The county council was based at County Hall in Worcester. It was replaced by Herefordshire Council and Worcestershire County Council.

Political control
The first elections to the council were held in 1973, initially operating as a shadow authority until the new arrangements came into effect on 1 April 1974. Political control of the council from 1974 until its abolition in 2009 was held by the following parties:

Leadership
The leaders of the council included:

Council elections
1973 Hereford and Worcester County Council election
1977 Hereford and Worcester County Council election
1981 Hereford and Worcester County Council election
1985 Hereford and Worcester County Council election
1989 Hereford and Worcester County Council election
1993 Hereford and Worcester County Council election

References

 
Council elections in Hereford and Worcester
County council elections in England
Former county councils of England
1974 establishments in England
1998 disestablishments in England
County Council